Dance Academy is an Australian children's television drama. The show aired on ABC1 and ABC3 in Australia, and on ZDF in Germany. Series one premiered in Australia on 31 May 2010, the second series began on 12 March 2012, and series three began on 8 July 2013.

Series overview

Episode list

Series 1 (2010) 
Dance Academy features Tara Webster (Xenia Goodwin), a new student at Australia's National Academy of Dance. The show presents the students at the Academy learning the intricacies of ballet and dance, and is primarily shown from Tara's perspective, along with fellow first year students Kat Karamakov (Alicia Banit), Abigail Armstrong (Dena Kaplan), Sammy Lieberman (Tom Green), Christian Reed (Jordan Rodrigues), and third year student Ethan Karamakov (Tim Pocock).

Series 2 (2012) 
Dance Academy was announced as having been renewed for a second series of 26 episodes on 15 July 2010. Casting calls were issued on 14 September 2010, and filming took place between 31 January and 4 August 2011 in and around Sydney. The series premiered on ABC3 on 12 March 2012, and concluded on 24 April 2012. The series was again executive produced by Joanna Werner. Series two featured Tara and the other students' second year at the Academy, and their efforts to make it through to represent Australia at a major ballet competition, the Prix de Fonteyn.

Series 3 (2013) 
Dance Academy series three began airing on ABC3 on 8 July 2013. This series follows Tara and her friends in their final year at the Academy, where they are focused on landing a job with The company.

Movie (2017)
The movie based on the series, featuring most of the original cast, was released in Australia on 6 April 2017.

References

External links 
 
 

Lists of Australian children's television series episodes
Lists of Australian drama television series episodes